Goya Gutiérrez is a Spanish poet and writer.

Biography 
Born in a small village of the Aragon region, Spain, in 1954, Gutiérrez has lived in Barcelona since 1968. She holds a degree in Spanish Philology from the University of Barcelona.

Published literary works

Books of poetry
 Regresar Editorial Bauma Cuadernos de poesía (Barcelona, 1995)
 De mares y espumas Editorial La mano en el cajón (Barcelona, 2001)
 La mirada y el viaje Editorial Emboscall. Colección "Prima Materia" número 40(Vic – Barcelona, 2004)
 El cantar de las amantes Editorial Emboscall (Vic- Barcelona, 2006)
 Ánforas Editorial Devenir (Madrid 2009)
Hacia lo abierto, (Barcelona, 2011)
Desde la oscuridad. From the darkness, (Barcelona, 2014)
Grietas de luz, Editorial Vaso Roto Colección Poesía (2015)
Y a pesar de la niebla, in-VERSO ediciones de Poesía (Barcelona, 2018)

Novels 

 (e-book) Seres Circulares Amazon Kindle Direct Publishing, 2019.

Anthologies
 Carlos Morales (2005) "25 años de poesía en Cataluña (1980-2005)" Revista Cuadernos del Ateneo nº20. Ateneo de La Laguna (La Laguna - Tenerife, Spain)
 Antoni Clapés  (2006) "Des de la Terra". Poesia als parcs 2005. Diputación de Barcelona (Barcelona, Spain)
 Teresa Costa-Gramunt and Yara Monturiol (2007) "Lluernes al celobert". March Editor (Barcelona, Spain)
 Josep Anton Soldevilla, et al. (2008) "El Laberinto de Ariadna". Editorial Emboscall (Vic-Barcelona, Spain).
 Meri Torres (2009) Antología poética "El poder del cuerpo". Editorial Castalia (Madrid, Spain)
Antología Festival Internacional de Poesía de Curtea De Arges 2015 (Rumanía) Edita Academiei Internationale Orient-Occident.
Edu Barbero Tiempo (in) Visible, Antología de fotografías de Edu Barbero y 24 poetas. Edita Revista Caravansari, Madrid, 2016.
Vicente Luis Mora Ensayo "El sujeto boscoso. Tipologías subjetivas de la poesía española contemporánea entre el espejo y la notredad (1980-2015)". Editorial Iberoamericana Vervuer t, octubre del 2016.
M.A. García de León, Milagros Salvador y María Sangüesa, Antología "Bajo la estrella el viento" Mujeres poetas de las dos orillas. Huerga & Fierro editores (Madrid, 2016) Prólogo: Juana Castro.
Esteban Charpentier y Robert Max Oír ese Río Antología poética de los cinco continentes. Ediorial Echarper, Colombia 2017.

References

External links 
 Poéticas (antología de la poesía universal)
 The Barcelona Review 65

Living people
20th-century Spanish poets
1954 births
21st-century Spanish poets
Spanish women poets
20th-century Spanish women writers
21st-century Spanish women writers